"Danger!" is a story written by Arthur Conan Doyle for publication in Strand Magazine in July 1914. The story dealt with a fictitious European country (Norland) going to war with Great Britain, and was intended to call attention to the threat of submarines in warfare.

The story has the submarines establish a blockade of British ports in order to cut off the nation's supplies, and culminates in the torpedoing of a large passenger liner.

Collections
The story was collected in Danger! And Other Stories in 1918.

1914 short stories
Invasion literature
Short stories by Arthur Conan Doyle
Submarines in fiction
Works originally published in The Strand Magazine